Green Local Schools is a school district serving portions of central Wayne County, Ohio, including Smithville and Marshallville. The district's superintendent is the 2017 Ohio Principal of the Year Dean Frank.

Schools
Smithville High School (grades 9 through 12)
Green Middle School (grades 6 through 8)
Green Elementary School (grades K through 5)

All three schools share one combined school building located in Smithville, which was completed in 2014. The K-12 building simultaneously replaced all four school buildings which were then in use: Smithville Elementary School, Marshallville Elementary School, Greene Middle School, and the old Smithville High School.

Demographics
As of the 2020/21 school year, 1,062 students attend Green Local Schools. The majority of the students are white (91.1%). Approximately 9.3% of the students have disabilities and 24.2% of students are economically disadvantaged. As of the 2015/16 school year, the district has an attendance rate of 96.8%. With approximately 81.5 teachers in the district, the average student-to-teacher ratio is about 12.5 to 1. Teachers have an average salary of $51,991 with an average teaching experience of 5 years.

References

External links
 District Website
 Athletics Website

School districts in Ohio